Levoberezhny (masculine), Levoberezhnaya (feminine), or Levoberezhnoye (neuter) is the name of several rural localities in Russia:
Levoberezhny, Omsk Oblast, a crossing loop in Bogoslovsky Rural Okrug of Omsky District in Omsk Oblast; 
Levoberezhny, Rostov Oblast, a khutor in Zadonskoye Rural Settlement of Azovsky District in Rostov Oblast; 
Levoberezhny, Stavropol Krai, a settlement in Pokoynensky Selsoviet of Budyonnovsky District in Stavropol Krai
Levoberezhny, Vologda Oblast, a settlement in Osinovsky Selsoviet of Nikolsky District in Vologda Oblast
Levoberezhnoye, Chechen Republic, a selo in Levoberezhnenskaya Rural Administration of Naursky District in the Chechen Republic
Levoberezhnoye, Kaliningrad Oblast, a settlement in Yasnovsky Rural Okrug of Slavsky District in Kaliningrad Oblast
Levoberezhnoye, Krasnoyarsk Krai, a selo in Filimonovsky Selsoviet of Kansky District in Krasnoyarsk Krai
Levoberezhnaya, a village in Kablukovskoye Rural Settlement of Kalininsky District in Tver Oblast